Gregg Naumenko (born March 30, 1977 in Chicago, Illinois) is an American former professional ice hockey goaltender. He played two seasons for the USHL's North Iowa Huskies and one season for the University of Alaska Anchorage before beginning his professional career. He played two games for the Mighty Ducks of Anaheim in 2001, spending the majority of his career in the minor leagues.

Playing career
Naumenko appeared in two NHL games in the 2000–01 season with the Mighty Ducks of Anaheim, recording an 0–1 record with a 6.00 GAA and a .759 save percentage. The majority of his career was spent in the AHL and ECHL.

He split the 2005–06 season between five teams: the AHL's Chicago Wolves, Portland Pirates, Albany River Rats, and Peoria Rivermen, and the ECHL's Dayton Bombers.  He played for the ECHL's Trenton Titans in the 2006–07 season.

International play
He represented the United States in 2002 IIHF World Championship. He played one game during the tournament, a 5-4 defeat against the Czech Republic.

Post-playing career
Naumenko currently coaches at Admirals Hockey Club as a goalie coach. In August 2017, he was named an associate coach to the Omaha Lancers in the USHL.

Career statistics

Regular season and playoffs

International

Awards and honors

References

External links
 

1977 births
Living people
Alaska Anchorage Seawolves men's ice hockey players
Albany River Rats players
American men's ice hockey goaltenders
Augusta Lynx players
Charlotte Checkers (1993–2010) players
Chicago Wolves players
Cincinnati Cyclones (ECHL) players
Cincinnati Mighty Ducks players
Cleveland Barons (2001–2006) players
Dayton Bombers players
Fort Wayne Komets players
Mighty Ducks of Anaheim players
North Iowa Huskies players
Peoria Rivermen (AHL) players
Portland Pirates players
South Carolina Stingrays players
Trenton Titans players
Ice hockey people from Chicago
Undrafted National Hockey League players